Lois Wendland Banner (born 1939) is an American author and retired professor of history from the University of Southern California.

She received her doctorate of philosophy from Columbia University.  She is the author of the textbook Women in Modern America: A Brief History, which is commonly used in introductory Women's studies classes at the university level. She helped found the Berkshire Conference on the History of Women at Rutgers University in 1973.

She has written biographies of Margaret Mead, Ruth Benedict and Marilyn Monroe.

Selected publications
 Women in Modern America: A Brief History, 1974.  According to WorldCat, the book was held in 1715 libraries  
 Elizabeth Cady Stanton: A Radical for Women's Rights. Addison-Wesley Publishers, 1979. According to WorldCat, the book is held in 1990 libraries  
 American Beauty, Alfred Knopf, 1983. According to WorldCat, the book was held in 1438 libraries  
 Finding Fran: History and Memory in the Lives of Two Women, Columbia University Press, 1998.
 In Full Flower: Aging Women, Power, and Sexuality, Alfred Knopf, 1992.
 Intertwined Lives: Margaret Mead, Ruth Benedict, and Their Circle, Alfred Knopf, 2003.According to WorldCat, the book was held in 911 libraries  
 MM-Personal: From the Private Archive of Marilyn Monroe, Abrams, 2011. According to WorldCat, the book is held in 238 libraries  
 Marilyn: The Passion and the Paradox, Bloomsbury USA, 2012: . According to WorldCat, the book was held in 1308 libraries

References

External links
Lois Banner faculty page at USC
Lois Banner blog page

 Book draft, 1979: A Finding Aid. Schlesinger Library, Radcliffe Institute, Harvard University.
 
 Biography (Veteran Feminists of America)

1939 births
Living people
Feminist studies scholars
Columbia Graduate School of Arts and Sciences alumni
University of Southern California faculty
American women historians
Fulbright Distinguished Chairs
21st-century American historians
21st-century American women writers
Historians from California